Acıbadem (Turkish for bitter almond) may refer to:
 Acıbadem, Kadıköy, a neighborhood in Kadıköy, İstanbul, Turkey
 Acıbadem Healthcare Group, a Turkish leading institution
 Acıbadem kurabiyesi, Turkish biscuit made of almonds, sugar and egg whites
 Acıbadem University, a private university in Istanbul, Turkey